Machin may refer to:

People
 Alfred Machin (director) (1877–1929), French film director
 Alfred Machin (writer) (born 1888), British writer on social evolution
 Antonio Machín (1903–1977), Cuban singer and musician
 Arnold Machin (1911–1999), British artist
 Ernie Machin (1944–2012), British football player
 Henry Machin (1832–1918), Quebec bureaucrat
 John Machin (1680–1751), British mathematician
 Mel Machin (born 1945), British football player and manager
 Pablo Machín (born 1975), Spanish football player and manager
 Peter Machin (footballer) (born 1883), English football player
 Peter Machin (darts player) (born 1973), Australian darts player
 Stuart Machin, CEO of Marks & Spencer
 Tim N. Machin (died 1915), Lieutenant Governor of California, 1863-67
 Timothy Machin (born 1948), British cricketer
 Vimael Machín (born 1993), Puerto Rican baseball player
 W. H. Machin (fl. 1900–1905), British football player

Characters
 Henry "Denry" Machin, the main character in the 1911 novel The Card by Arnold Bennett
 Lonnie Machin, the secret identity of the DC Comics character Anarky

Places
 Machin, Ontario, a township in Ontario, Canada

See also 

 Machen (disambiguation)
 Machin-like formula, a class of mathematical identities
 Machin series, a series of British stamps
 Cerro Machín, a volcano in Colombia
 Machon (disambiguation)

Occupational surnames